The Balgimbayev Cabinet was the 3rd government of Kazakhstan composition led by Nurlan Balgimbayev. The government was formed after Prime Minister Akezhan Kazhegeldin resigned due to apparent health reasons. That same day on 10 October 1997, President Nursultan Nazarbayev appointed Balgimbayev to be the Prime Minister who was approved by the Parliament.

In 1999, Balgimbayev's government faced a scandal after it had allowed to illegally sell MiG-21 aircraft to North Korea which led to rumors of Balgimbayev's possible resignation from the post. On 1 October 1999, he announced his resignation stating that the need for a government to tackle the economic crisis and as a result, Kassym-Jomart Tokayev who served as a Deputy Prime Minister under Balgimbayev became the Acting Prime Minister until his confirmation on 12 October.

Composition

References 

Cabinets of Kazakhstan
1997 in Kazakhstan
Cabinets established in 1997
1997 establishments in Kazakhstan